Nurcihan Ekinci  is  a Turkish European champion Para Taekwondo practitioner. She competes in the K44 event of the -47 kg class.

Private life
Nurcihan Ekinci, living in Tatvan of Bitlis Province,  lost her left arm at  a little age after she fell from high above.  In 2013, she began with taekwondo motivated by her school teacher. She is a student at the Fırat University in Elazığ, Turkey. She is also a member of the Turkey national kickboxing team.

Sports career
Ekinci took the bronze medal at the 2021 European Para Taekwondo Championships held in Istanbul, Turkey. At the 9th World Para Taekwondo Championships, she became silver medalist. She won the gold medal at the 2022 European Taekwondo Championships in Manchester, United Kingdom.

References

People from Bitlis
Paralympic taekwondo practitioners of Turkey
Turkish female taekwondo practitioners
Turkish female kickboxers
Year of birth missing (living people)
Living people
21st-century Turkish sportswomen